Francis Augustus Cox (1783–1853) was a prominent English Baptist minister. He began preaching in his teens, before training, and was then a minister for over forty years in Hackney.

Cox was an active supporter of the formation of the University of London. He published numerous articles including a book of biographies and a history of the Baptist Missionary Society.

Biography
Cox was born in Leighton Buzzard in 1783 and he was baptised at the age of twelve. After some early preaching as a teenager, schooling in Northampton and receipt of a substantial inheritance from his grandfather he attended the Baptist College in Bristol. Cox became a Baptist minister after graduating with an MA from the University of Edinburgh.

In 1805 he was appointed minister in Clipston in Northamptonshire, before taking up a position at the St Andrew's Street Church in Cambridge which dates from 1764. However Cox resigned in 1808 and returned to Clipston.

His congregation for 42 years was in Hackney where his church was eventually at Mare Street.

When the University of London was founded in 1828, he sat briefly on its committee, this may have been due to his active support for the formation of the University. He was also the librarian at the University for a short while.

He served as secretary of the Protestant Society for three years; and in a group of Protestant Dissenting Ministers.

He served on the committee for Repeal of the Test and Corporation Acts which succeeded in 1829 of allowing Catholics to serve in parliament when the Catholic Relief Act was passed. In 1832 Cox was involved in trying to save the British and Foreign Seaman and Soldiers' Friend Society following a public scandal but resigned shortly after his appointment.

Cox received an LLD degree from the University of Glasgow through his friendship with Lord Brougham and he was later made a Docter of Divinity by the "University of Waterville" whilst on a visit to America on behalf of the Baptists in 1838.

Two years later, Cox attended the 1840 British and Foreign Anti-Slavery Society convention in London and he was included in the painting which is now in the National Portrait Gallery in London.

Cox died in 1858 in Hackney, having been married three times and fathering seven children. His body of published work was immense. He founded the Baptist Magazine in 1809 and wrote extensively for it. As late as 1852 he had contributed an article on Palestinian Biblical antiquities to the Encyclopædia Metropolitana. Two volumes of biographies of women in the Bible, a history of the Baptist Missionary Society and a life of Philip Melanchthon are some of his major works.

Criticism by the American Anti-Slavery Society

In 1838, while in America, Cox declined an invitation to speak at a gathering of the American Anti-Slavery Society in New York. In one of the society's publications, a writer chastised Cox for the manner and reasons for declining the invitation. He apparently delayed an answer to the invitation until the morning of the meeting claiming to be undecided and then declined in a message citing a conviction that ministers should not get involved in politics. The writer for the society believed this to be a disingenuous reason, especially given the fact that Cox was sent to America to urge American Baptist ministers to preach against slavery.

References

External links

 
 
 
 Cox, Francis Augustus (1783-1853) Baptist Preacher 139807

1853 deaths
1783 births
Alumni of the University of Edinburgh
Baptist abolitionists
English abolitionists
People from Leighton Buzzard